Tirtayasa (1631–1695), complete stylized name Sultan Ageng Tirtayasa, also known as Ageng and Abulfatah Agung, was the sixth sultan of Banten (on Java in modern Indonesia) and reigned during the kingdom's golden age.

Overview
Ageng built a strong fleet on European models, which did considerable trade within the Indonesian archipelago, and, with help from the English, Danes, and Chinese, were able to trade with Persia, India, Siam, Vietnam, China, the Philippines, and Japan in the Javanese tradition of long-distance traders. This trade gave considerable wealth to Banten, the greatest period for which was arguably under Sultan Ageng Tirtayasa.
In 1661 Ageng extended Banten rule to Landak in western Borneo. In the 1670s he also acquired Cirebon area following civil war in Mataram. Ageng established trade with Spanish Manila for silver and built canal for coconut palm and sugar plantations, among other developments.

Principal activities

Conflict with the Dutch
Ageng was a strong opponent of the Dutch East India Company (VOC), and inevitably came into conflict with their headquarters at Batavia (modern Jakarta), 75 km to the east. In this sentiment Ageng also came into conflict with his son, the crown prince and later sultan, Haji of Banten (or Abu Nasr). Haji held considerable power in Banten, and was in favor of gaining support from the VOC. The court split into two factions, one supporting the father which was supported by the more militant Muslim elite; and the other faction supported the son.

In 1656, the fragile 1645 treaty between the Dutch and Banten broke, and war erupted. The Bantenese raided Batavian districts and VOC ships, and the VOC blockaded the Bantenese port. A peace settlement was reached in 1659, but the VOC sought a stronger settlement, and was able to take advantage of the internal division in Bantenese politics to achieve it.

Internal conflict
Ageng withdrew to a residence outside Banten proper sometime before 1671, in order to forestall a palace coup he anticipated from his son. He supported Trunajaya's rebellion in the Mataram Sultanate, and was highly critical of Amangkurat II and his relationship with the VOC. He was able to gain control of Cirebon and the Priangan highlands when Mataram fell into disarray, thus surrounding Batavia with his troops.

Defeat
However, he did not declare war on the Dutch until 1680, on the pretext of some mistreatment of Bantenese merchants on the part of the VOC. The Dutch were now stronger after their victory at Kediri over the Mataram rebels. In May 1680, though, before hostilities began, Haji led a coup and confined Ageng to his residence. His supporters gained the upper hand in 1682, but when a VOC force came to support the compromises of Haji, they drove Ageng from his residence into the highlands, where he surrendered in March 1683. He was kept in Banten for a while, and later moved to Batavia, where he died in 1695.

Letters to Danish Kings
In order to extend the trade relations, Sultan Ageng Tirtayasa sent some official letters to King Frederick III of Denmark and to King Christian V of Denmark. Dated on January 7, 1675, both the sultan and the Shahbandar of Banten (Western Java) wrote a letter to Frederick III. The sultan asked for cannon and powder and mentioned that 176 bahara (a weight) of pepper, for which there had been no room in the Danish ship Færö, were being kept in store.

Another letter to Christian V is dated February 15, 1675. The sultan again mentions the 176 baharas of pepper which had been deposited by Captain Adeler with the Banten nobleman, Duke Angabèhi Cakradana of Bantam. Due to massive Dutch traders approaching Java, the Dutch conquered Bantam. Hence, the Danish no longer had permission to trade in Sunda Kelapa.

References
 M.C. Ricklefs. A History of Modern Indonesia Since c. 1300, 2nd ed. Stanford: Stanford University Press, 1994, pp. 78–79.

Citations

1695 deaths
1631 births
Sultans of Banten
National Heroes of Indonesia
17th-century Indonesian people